The Ahmedabad–Gorakhpur Express is an Superfast Express train belonging to Western Railway zone that runs between  and  in India. It is currently being operated with 19409/19410 train numbers on bi-weekly basis.

Service

19409  Ahmedabad–Gorakhpur Express has an average speed of 49 km/hr and covers 1570 km in 32h 15m. The 19410 Gorakhpur–Ahmedabad Express has an average speed of 48 km/hr and covers 1570 km in 32h 45m.

Route & halts

The important halts of the train are;

Coach composition

The train has modern LHB rakes with max speed of 110 kmph. The train consists of 18 coaches:

 1 AC II Tier
 2 AC III Tier
 8 Sleeper coaches
 5 General Unreserved
 2 Luggage Brake cum Generator cars

Traction

Both trains are hauled by a Vatva Loco Shed / Abu Road Loco Shed-based WDM-3A diesel locomotive from Ahmedabad Junction to Gorakhpur Junction and vice versa.

Rake sharing

The train shares its rake with:

 19421/19422 Ahmedabad–Patna Weekly Express, 
 19403/19404 Ahmedabad–Sultanpur Weekly Express.

Direction reversal
The train reverses its direction once at:

 .

See also 

 Ahmedabad Junction railway station
 Sultanpur Junction railway station
 Ahmedabad–Patna Weekly Express
 Ahmedabad–Sultanpur Weekly Express
 Ahmedabad–Varanasi Weekly Express
 Sabarmati Express

References

Notes

External links 

19409/Ahmedabad–Gorakhpur Express India Rail Info
19410/Gorakhpur–Ahmedabad Express India Rail Info

Rail transport in Gujarat
Rail transport in Rajasthan
Passenger trains originating from Gorakhpur
Transport in Ahmedabad
Railway services introduced in 2012
Express trains in India